A young adult is a person in their late teens or early twenties.

Young adult may refer to:
 Young adult, the topic overview
 Young Adult (film), a 2011 American comedy-drama film
 Young adult animation
 Young adult fiction, works generally targeted at ages 12 to 18

See also
 Adolescent
 Minor (law)
 Youth, an age category